Richard Weaver (1575 – 16 May 1642) was an English politician who sat in the House of Commons  variously between 1621 and 1642.

Weaver was the son of Edmund Weaver of Stapleton, Llanandrad, Herefordshire and his wife Margery Burhope.

In 1621, Weaver was elected Member of Parliament for Hereford and was re-elected until 1626. In 1627 he was elected Mayor of Hereford.

In April 1640, Weaver was elected again MP  for Hereford in the Short Parliament and in November 1640 for the Long Parliament. He held the seat until his death in 1642. 
Weaver died at the Above Eigne, Hereford, aged 66 and was buried in Hereford Cathedral.

Weaver married Katherine Fox.  Their son Edmund Weaver was also MP for Hereford.

References

 

1575 births
1642 deaths
Mayors of Hereford
English MPs 1621–1622
English MPs 1624–1625
English MPs 1625
English MPs 1626
English MPs 1640 (April)
English MPs 1640–1648